Ajab Singh Ki Gajab Kahani  is a Hindi film directed Rishi Prakash Mishra, produced by Binod Kumar and featured Ajay Kumar Singh, Yashpal Sharma, Vikas Giri, Manoj Mishra, Govind Namdev, Amit Koushik and Rajesh Jais. The film is a biopic of a disabled Indian Revenue Service officer Ajay Singh.

Plot
The film is a biopic of a disabled Indian Revenue Service officer, Ajay Singh.

Cast
Ajay Kumar Singh as Ajab SIngh 
Govind Namdev as Bacha singh
Yashpal Sharma	
Rajesh Jais 
Amit Koushik as Police officer -pappu yadav
Manoj Mishra
Vikas Giri
Madhu Roy
Master Atharva Raj
Mukesh Ahuja 
Archana Prasad  
Hansa Tiwari
Lucinda Nicholas 
 Mukesh Kumar  
Shiv Prasad

References

External links